The women's 1000 metres races of the 2014–15 ISU Speed Skating World Cup 6, arranged in the Thialf arena in Heerenveen, Netherlands, were held on the weekend of 7–8 February 2015. It was the only competition weekend of the season where the distance was skated twice.

Race one was won by Heather Richardson of the United States, while Brittany Bowe of the United States came second, and Li Qishi of China came third. Thijsje Oenema of the Netherlands won Division B of race one, and was thus, under the rules, automatically promoted to Division A for race two.

Race two was won by Brittany Bowe of the United States, while Marrit Leenstra of the Netherlands came second, and Karolína Erbanová of the Czech Republic came third. Annouk van der Weijden of the Netherlands won Division B of race two.

Race 1
Race one took place on Saturday, 7 February, with Division B scheduled in the morning session, at 12:51, and Division A scheduled in the afternoon session, at 16:33.

Division A

Division B

Race 2
Race two took place on Sunday, 8 February, with Division B scheduled in the morning session, at 12:25, and Division A scheduled in the afternoon session, at 16:24.

Division A

Division B

References

Women 1000
6